Midridge is an unincorporated community in northeastern Shannon County, Missouri, United States. It is located on a county road approximately sixteen miles northeast of Eminence.

A post office called Midridge was established in 1931, and remained in operation until 1964. The community was so named on account of its location midway across a ridge.

References

Unincorporated communities in Shannon County, Missouri
Unincorporated communities in Missouri